The Bear Tavern Road–Jacob's Creek Crossing Rural Historic District covers the farms along Bear Tavern Road north of its intersection with Jacob's Creek Road, as well as the bridge and intersection itself.  Bear Tavern Road dates to 1729 and George Washington led the Continental Army along it in 1776, on his way from crossing the Delaware to the Battle of Trenton.  The district still reflects its 18th and 19th century patterns of development.

See also
Bear Tavern, New Jersey
National Register of Historic Places listings in Mercer County, New Jersey

References

Historic districts in Mercer County, New Jersey
National Register of Historic Places in Mercer County, New Jersey
Hopewell Township, Mercer County, New Jersey
Ewing Township, New Jersey
Historic districts on the National Register of Historic Places in New Jersey
New Jersey Register of Historic Places